The Chinese Classification of Mental Disorders (CCMD), published by the Chinese Society of Psychiatry (CSP), is a clinical guide used in China for the diagnosis of mental disorders. It is on a third version, the CCMD-3, written in Chinese and English. 

The current edition is very similar to the ICD-10, and is also influenced by the DSM-IV, the two main psychiatric typologies used in the rest of the world. However, it has a unique definition of some disorders, includes an additional 40 or so culturally related diagnoses, and lacks certain conditions recognised in other parts of the world.

History 
The first published Chinese psychiatric classificatory scheme appeared in 1979. A revised classification system, the CCMD-1, was made available in 1981 and further modified in 1984 (CCMD-2-R), 1989 and 1995. The CCMD-3 was published in 2001. 

At launch, the CCMD-3 was supplemented with the companion book "Treatment and Nursing of Mental Disorders Relevant to CCMD-3".

Many Chinese psychiatrists believed the CCMD had special advantages over other manuals, such as simplicity, stability, the inclusion of culture-distinctive categories, and the exclusion of certain Western diagnostic categories. The Chinese translation of the ICD-10 was seen as linguistically complicated, containing very long sentences and awkward terms and syntax.

A 2014 study found that the ICD-10 was more commonly used by Chinese psychiatrists than the CCMD-3 or DSM-IV.

Diagnostic categories 

The diagnosis of depression is included in the CCMD, with many similar criteria to the ICD or DSM, with the core having been translated as 'low spirits'. However, neurasthenia is a more central diagnosis. Although also found in the ICD, its diagnosis takes a particular form in China, called 'shenjing shuairuo', which emphasizes somatic (bodily) complaints as well as fatigue or depressed feelings. Neurasthenia is a less stigmatizing diagnosis than depression in China, being conceptually distinct from psychiatric labels, and is said to fit well with a tendency to express emotional issues in somatic terms. The concept of neurasthenia as a nervous system disorder is also said to fit well with the traditional Chinese epistemology of disease causation on the basis of disharmony of vital organs and imbalance of qi.

The diagnosis of schizophrenia is included in the CCMD. It is applied quite readily and broadly in Chinese psychiatry.

Some of the wordings of the diagnosis are different, for example rather than borderline personality disorder as in the DSM, or emotionally unstable personality disorder (borderline type) as in the ICD, the CCMD has impulsive personality disorder.

Diagnoses that are more specific to Chinese or Asian culture, though they may also be outlined in the ICD (or DSM glossary section), includes:

Koro or Genital retraction syndrome: excessive fear of the genitals (and also breasts in women) shrinking or drawing back into the body.
Zou huo ru mo or qigong deviation: perception of uncontrolled flow of qi in the body.
Mental disorders due to superstition or witchcraft. 
Travelling psychosis

The CCMD-3 lists several "disorders of sexual preference" including ego-dystonic homosexuality, but does not recognize pedophilia.

Koro

Koro or Genital retraction syndrome is a culture-specific syndrome from Southeast Asia in which the patient has an overpowering belief that the genitalia (or nipples in females) are shrinking and will shortly disappear. In China, it is known as shuk yang, shook yong, and suo yang.  This has been associated with cultures placing a heavy emphasis on balance, or on fertility and reproduction.

Zou huo ru mo

Zou huo ru mo or "qigong deviation" is a mental condition characterized by the perception that there is uncontrolled flow of qi in the body.  Other complaints include localized pains, headache, insomnia, and uncontrolled spontaneous movements.

See also
International Statistical Classification of Diseases and Related Health Problems (ICD) of the World Health Organization
Diagnostic and Statistical Manual of Mental Disorders (DSM) of the American Psychiatric Association
DSM-IV Codes
Political abuse of psychiatry in China

References

External links
 CSP webpage about the CCMD

Classification of mental disorders
Healthcare in China
Medical manuals